Deathmaze 5000 is TRS-80 computer game written by Frank Corr, Jr. and published by Med Systems Software in 1980. It was ported to the Apple II and followed by the second game in the Continuum series, Labyrinth.

Gameplay
Deathmaze 5000 is a first-person graphic adventure in which the player begins on the top floor of a five-story building and moves through labyrinthine hallways, with a goal of escaping before starving to death. The adventurer must fight monsters, collect objects, and solve puzzles.

Reception
Russ Williams reviewed Deathmaze 5000 in The Space Gamer No. 47. Williams commented that "Deathmaze 5000 is an excellent game which will not be solved in a few weeks. If you like the prospect of a game that could last you for a very long time, get it. It's better than many [more expensive] games I've seen, both in price and in gaming value."

References

External links
Review in 80 Micro
 Deathmaze 5000 disassembly and analysis

1980 video games
Apple II games
Horror video games
Survival video games
TRS-80 games
Video games developed in the United States